Ludovico Bidoglio, sometimes nicknamed Vico (5 February 1900 – 25 December 1970) was an Argentine football player, and one of Boca Juniors' idols during the 1920s. His position on the field was right back.

Due his elegant style, precise passing and marking, Bidoglio was regarded as one of the best defenders of his era, winning 10 titles with Boca Juniors. Bidoglio also played in the Argentina national team, where he won two South American Championships and a silver medal at the 1928 Summer Olympics.

Career 
Bidoglio made his debut with Sportivo Palermo in 1916, playing as right winger. During a match in which a fullback was injured, he had to take his place as a defender and from then on, Bidoglio would never play again in an attack position.

After playing for Eureka between 1918 and 1922, he made his debut with Boca Juniors in 1923, in a friendly match against Independiente. Due to his elegant style of game, much different from strong, hard and even rude defenders, Bidoglio caught the attention of the press and the fans, soon being recognized as one of the best defenders in Argentina at that time. His elegant style was the opposite to the thoughness and fierce marking of Ramón Muttis, the other back of the team by then.

With Boca Juniors, Bidoglio spent the most prolific years of his career, winning 10 titles with the club (5 League championships, 4 National cups and 1 international competition).

Bidoglio was first called up for Argentina in 1921, to play a friendly match v Paraguay. although his most notable match was v Uruguay in 1924, when he replaced Adolfo Celli, who had severely injured after trying to steal the ball to Pedro Cea. Bidoglio replaced Celli, becoming the first Argentine player to substitute another during a match. Bidoglio's last match with Argentina was the second final v Uruguay at the 1928 Olympics.

Bidoglio's unexpected retirement from football was in 1931 during a match v Estudiantes de La Plata, where Bidoglio collided with Alberto Zozaya being seriously injured, therefore he had to leave the field. He would never return to play. Boca went on to win the 1931 championship, meaning that Bidoglio had helped the squad to win the 7th. league title for the club. After his retirement from football Bidoglio worked as an electrician until his death in 1970.

Having been in Europe during the Boca Juniors tour of 1925 and the 1928 Summer Olympics in Amsterdam, Bidoglio became nostalgic when speaking of those trips, as he stated in an interview with El Gráfico's journalist, "Borocotó", in 1934, three years after his retirement:

When his career as footballer ended, Bidoglio continued working as electrician in the Minister of Public Works of Argentina. He was also manager of Boca Juniors in 1933, coaching a team in the 1933 Primera División and Copa de Competencia Jockey Club for a total of 20 matches.

Bidoglio died in 1970.

Honours

Club 
Boca Juniors
 Primera División (5): 1923, 1924, 1926, 1930, 1931
 Copa Ibarguren (2): 1923, 1924
 Copa de Competencia Jockey Club (1): 1925
 Copa Estímulo (1): 1926
 Copa de Honor Cousenier (1): 1920

National team 
Argentina 
 Copa América (2): 1925, 1927
 Summer Olympics:  1928

References 

1900 births
1970 deaths
Footballers from Buenos Aires
Argentine people of Italian descent
Argentine footballers
Boca Juniors footballers
Argentine Primera División players
Argentina international footballers
Footballers at the 1928 Summer Olympics
Olympic footballers of Argentina
Olympic silver medalists for Argentina
Olympic medalists in football
Medalists at the 1928 Summer Olympics
Association football defenders